No Place Like Home is the tenth stand-up comedy album by American comedian Doug Stanhope. It was recorded live in Bisbee, Arizona and released on November 18, 2016 via Comedy Dynamics. The album peaked at #1 on the US Billboard Comedy Albums chart.

Track listing

Chart history

References

External links 

 
 No Place Like Home on Comedy Dynamics
 Doug Stanhope's official website

2016 live albums
Doug Stanhope albums
2010s comedy albums
Stand-up comedy albums